Richard Bedford is a Grammy Award-nominated British singer-songwriter.

Biography 

Bedford is widely known for his vocal work in electronic dance music (EDM) and trance including his collaborations with Above & Beyond on their 2011 album Group Therapy, their 2006 album Tri-state, Armin van Buuren's 2013 album Intense IDMA-nominated singles "Alone Tonight" and "Sun & Moon" & Grammy Nominated single "Northern Soul". Having started life as a keyboard player in various bands, Bedford turned to song-writing and singing in 1998, before working with Above & Beyond on their debut album Tri-State in early 2005. 

Bedford was named best EDM vocalist in 2013 by theuntz.com and number 3 EDM vocalist by EDM.com in 2014. Richard also performed on Armin van Buuren's "Armin Only Intense World Tour 2013/2014." He is currently working on his artist album and Humaniq project due for release in 2023.

Discography
Vocal Collaborations
 Above & Beyond – Alone Tonight (Anjunabeats)
 Above & Beyond – Stealing Time (Anjunabeats)
 Above & Beyond – Liquid Love (Anjunabeats)
 Above & Beyond featuring Richard Bedford – Sun & Moon (Anjunabeats)
 Above & Beyond featuring Richard Bedford – Thing Called Love (Anjunabeats) 
 Above & Beyond featuring Richard Bedford – With Your Hope (Anjunabeats)
 Above & Beyond featuring Richard Bedford – Every Little Beat (Anjunabeats) 
 Above & Beyond featuring Richard Bedford – On My Way to Heaven (Anjunabeats) 
 Above & Beyond featuring Tony McGuinness and Richard Bedford – Black Room Boy (Anjunabeats)
 Armin van Buuren feat Richard Bedford – Love Never Came (Armada Music/Positiva) 
 Judge Jules and Richard Bedford – Burn in the Sun (Judgement Recordings)
 Above & Beyond featuring Richard Bedford – Northern Soul (Anjunabeats)
 Above & Beyond featuring Richard Bedford – Happiness Amplified (Anjunabeats)
 Above & Beyond featuring Richard Bedford – Bittersweet & Blue (Anjunabeats)
 Matt Fax & Richard Bedford – Greatest Thing (Colorize Enhanced)
 Roman Messer & Richard Bedford – Breathe (Suanda Music)
 TEKNO, DJ T.H. & Richard Bedford – Make U Mine (inHarmony)
 Scorz & Richard Bedford - Change The Story (Armada Music)
 Aly & Fila x Chapter47 x Richard Bedford – Edge of Tomorrow (FSOE)

Writing Only Collaborations
 Dennis Sheperd & Cold Blue – Freefalling (feat. Chloe Langley) (High Contrast) 
 Dennis Sheperd – Left of the World (Euphonic & High Contrast)
 Airborne Cities – All I Need (Believe Digital)
 Dennis Sheperd and Jonathan Mendelsohn – Bring Me Back (High Contrast) 
 Dennis Sheperd – Feeder (High Contrast)
 Dennis Sheperd – Out in the Cold (High Contrast) 
 Mike Shiver feat Bo Bruce – Still Here (Armada) 
 Mike Shiver – Back to Life (Ride Recordings)

Albums:
 Above & Beyond – Tri-State (Anjunabeats Records)
 Above & Beyond – Group Therapy (Anjunabeats Records)
 Dennis Sheperd – A Tribute to Life (High Contrast)
 Armin van Buuren – Intense (Armada/Positiva)
 Above & Beyond – Acoustic 2 (Anjunabeats Records)
 Above & Beyond – Common Ground (Anjunabeats Records)
 Matt Fax – Progressions (Colorize Enhanced)
 Roman Messer - Written in the Stars (Suanda Music)

Awards

|-
| 2007 IDMA Awards
| Above & Beyond – "Alone Tonight"
| Best Trance Progressive Track
| 
|-
| 2012 IDMA Awards
| Above & Beyond feat Richard Bedford – "Sun & Moon"
| Best Progressive House/Trance Track
| 

|-

| 61st Grammy Awards 2019
| Above & Beyond feat Richard Bedford – "Northern Soul"
| Best Dance Recording
|

References

External links
Official website
Interview with Trance Hub, February 2012

Year of birth missing (living people)
Living people
Trance singers